Charlakola Laxma Reddy (born 3 February 1962) is the former Health Minister of Telangana, serving from 2014–2018. He is present Member of Legislative Assembly for Jadcherla constituency representing Telangana Rashtra Samithi. He served as the first Energy Minister for Telangana state and then was moved to take over the Health portfolio. He is also a former homeopathic doctor.

Early life and education
Reddy was born in Jadcherla and hails from Avancha Village of Thimmajipet Mandal. He received his graduation in Bachelor of Homoeopathic Medical Sciences from Hyderabad Karnataka Education Society, Gulbarga, Karnataka. He was a Student Leader President. Later he practiced as a Homeopathic Doctor at Jadcherla before entering into politics.

Political career
Laxma Reddy was very active in politics and held many posts from quite a young age. He started his political career as a sarpanch of his village, Avancha, in Thimmajipeta Mandal. Eventually, he did several services to Single Window System and Library Society at Thimmajipeta mandal level.

TRS Party
He joined Telangana Rashtra Samithi after K. Chandrashekhar Rao launched the party in 2001 and has been a key leader in the state movement. He won from the Jadcherla Constituency in 2004 Assembly Elections, but with KCR's call, Reddy was the first to resign his position in April 2008 when the Central government did not meet their demand for a separate state, but tragically lost the by-elections.

He was widely praised across the TRS party and by KCR as he was the only MLA of TRS party from Mahabubnagar District where the Telangana movement was the weakest in the state at the time. He supported KCR while contesting the Mahabubnagar MP seat, though he was not allocated seat in 2009 due to an alliance of TRS. Dr. Reddy had played a major role in the victory of KCR as he was only TRS leader in Mahabubnagar. The victory of KCR, accelerated the Telangana agitation where KCR as an Mahabubnagar MP took the fast-unto-death protest, finally later achieving Telangana. Thereupon, it is often said that he was the leader who took up the Telangana movement on his shoulders in the southernmost region when he was either in power or not.

As Minister
In 2014 Assembly elections, he was re-elected from Jadcherla and was inducted into Cabinet as Electricity Minister. After sacking of Deputy CM T. Rajaiah as Health Minister, Reddy replaced him and was handed over the Medical and Health Department.

Personal life
He is married to Dr. Swetha and has two children, Spoorthi Reddy and Swaran Reddy.

References
 

Living people
Telangana Rashtra Samithi politicians
State cabinet ministers of Telangana
Telugu politicians
Telangana politicians
Telangana MLAs 2014–2018
1962 births